The Arizona State Capitol in Phoenix, Arizona, United States, was the last home for Arizona's Territorial government, until Arizona became a state in 1912. Initially, all three branches of the new state government occupied the four floors of the statehouse. As the state expanded the branches relocated to adjacent buildings and additions. The 1901 portion of the Capitol is now maintained as the Arizona Capitol Museum with a focus on the history and culture of Arizona. The Arizona State Library, which occupied most of the 1938 addition until July 2017, re-opened in late 2018 as a part of the Arizona Capitol Museum.

Arizona Capitol Museum 

Museum exhibits, events, and programs focus on the evolution of Arizona from Territory to State. The Arizona Takes Shape exhibit provides school-age visitors curriculum-related information for Arizona State History and government studies.  The museum has over 20 exhibits featuring contemporary, historical and artifacts from the Arizona state-owned collections. Permanent exhibits include the sinking of USS Arizona, the formal silver service from USS Arizona, a timeline of events pivotal in making Arizona a state, the Governor and Secretary of State's original offices, the historical senate, and house.

Visitors can enter the Historic House Chamber where the people can sit at the desks. There is also a room dedicated to the 140 changes in the Arizona Constitution over 100 years of statehood. The Governor's office on the second includes artifacts from several of Arizona's governors as well as a flag used by Teddy Roosevelt's Rough Riders.

Both of these historical artifacts survived the sinking of Arizona because they had been removed from the ship for cleaning prior to the attack on Pearl Harbor. The punchbowl service is the only one of its kind and is composed of etched copper panels depicting desert scenes set into a silver bowl ornamented with mermaids, dolphins, waves, and other nautical themes.

Of particular interest is the display of a collection of gifts received by Arizona as part of the Merci Train sent by France to the United States following World War II. The French wanted to thank America for sending the Friendship Train: 250 railroad cars full of fuel, oil, and food in 1948 during a time that the European countries were devastated by World War II. Tens of thousands of French citizens donated objects to be sent to the United States and it was decided that because the outpouring of goods was so great, one boxcar would be sent to each state with one being shared between the District of Columbia and the Territory of Hawaii. All of the items were to be loaded in "Forty and Eight"-type boxcars, named after the sign painted on them which stated that 40 men or 8 horses could be loaded inside. Each car was to be adorned with the coats of arms of all of the provinces of France. The capitol building displays work by the noted Arizona artist Lon Megargee.

History
The building was created as part of an effort to demonstrate that the Arizona Territory was ready for statehood. A design contest was won by James Riely Gordon, whose original plan called for the Capitol to be much larger, with a more prominent rotunda and large wings for both houses of the legislature on each side of the current building. Funding deficits meant the project had to be reduced, so the legislative wings were discarded from the plan and a small lead-alloy top substituted for Gordon's decorative dome.

Construction of the Capitol began in 1898, and it began operation in 1901. In 1918 and 1938, expansions were added on the west side of the building, which had the same architecture and increased the total square footage from the original 40,000 to a final 123,000. It was home to the Legislature until 1960, when the current house and senate buildings were constructed, and the Governor's Office until 1974, when the executive tower was built. The state at that time had a plan of converting the original Capitol into a museum dedicated to Arizona's history. The original opening of the Arizona Capitol Museum was announced by Governor Bruce Babbitt at his inauguration in 1978 and hosted over 40,000 schoolchildren in that first year in 1979. After a restoration, the building was re-opened as a museum in 1981. In the 1990s, more than $3 million was spent to renovate the Capitol and rooms were restored to their original design. Again, due to budget deficits, construction was stopped on a few rooms on the third floor and they remain incomplete. The Capitol is listed on the National Register of Historic Places.

On January 14, 2010, the Arizona State Department of Administration reported that it had sold the surrounding state buildings to private investors: the tower, the two flanking legislative buildings, and other state structures. The old Capitol was not part of this transaction.

On the night of June 24, 2022, and into the morning of June 25, police and pro abortion activists clashed outside the building in protest of the Supreme Court ruling in Dobbs v. Jackson Women's Health Organization. The protesters numbered over 5,000 persons. The Arizona Department of Public Safety deployed tear gas and flash bang grenades against the protesters, forcing them to disperse. Arizona Senate Republicans accused the protestors of attempting to storm the building, with GOP
State Senator Kelly Townsend tweeting that the legislators were "being held hostage" and comparing the protest to the 2021 United States Capitol attack. She also called for a "J24 Committee" in reference to the January 6 committee.

Architecture

The building is made largely from materials indigenous to Arizona, including malapai, granite, and the copper dome. The design is optimized for the desert climate of Arizona, with thick masonry walls that insulate the interior, skylights, and round "bullseye" clerestory windows to let heat out of the legislative chambers. The building is topped with a weather vane similar to the Winged Victory of Samothrace, visible through a skylight from within the rotunda.

Capitol Mall renovation proposal
As Arizona's population has grown, the Capitol complex itself has become increasingly crowded.  The Senate and House buildings, opened in 1960, have been deteriorating.  The Senate, in particular, is prone to constant plumbing problems, and occasionally a broken pipe floods the entire building. The Capitol itself is now used exclusively as a museum, and serves over 70,000 visitors each year, including more than 50,000 school children.  In the past complaints had been made that the site was not pleasing aesthetically, and compare the Senate and House buildings as oversized "bunkers" which eclipse the beauty of the Capitol. A task force appointed by the state legislature in 2007 reported that the complex is "barely" adequate to suit the state's current needs and "wholly" inadequate to suit the state's future needs. As a result, proposals were made in 2008 to renovate or rebuild the Capitol site, to a grander site, as well as a site that will serve the needs of the government more adequately. To date, keeping the integrity of the 1901 building in original condition, including the "cramped" spaces occupied by some of the Senate and the House staff have been the main focus for the Capitol Museum administrator and staff.  The building's original usage is part of the state history.

Proposals for relocating some office and meeting space back into the Capitol included the House and Senate buildings undergo either a drastic rebuilding and expansion or a complete demolition and construction of new facilities for the House and Senate. A past Arizona State University study planned a comprehensive redesign for the entire Capitol mall and complex.

Gallery

See also

 Wesley Bolin Memorial Plaza
 USS Arizona salvaged artifacts
 List of state and territorial capitols in the United States

References

External links
 
 Virtual Tour of the Capitol Museum and Grounds

State capitols in the United States
Buildings and structures in Phoenix, Arizona
Government buildings with domes
Government buildings in Arizona
History museums in Arizona
Museums in Phoenix, Arizona
1900s in Arizona Territory
Government buildings completed in 1900
Government buildings on the National Register of Historic Places in Arizona
National Register of Historic Places in Phoenix, Arizona
Historic American Buildings Survey in Arizona
Tourist attractions in Phoenix, Arizona
James Riely Gordon buildings
Neoclassical architecture in Arizona
1900 establishments in Arizona Territory